Raphael Supusepa (born 13 August 1978 in the Netherlands) is a Dutch retired footballer.

Career

After making 1 league appearance for AFC Ajax, the most successful club in the Netherlands, Supusepa spent the rest of his professional playing career in the Dutch second division with SBV Excelsior, HFC Haarlem, Dordrecht, and MVV Maastricht, before playing for lower league sides Quick Boys, IJsselmeervogels, Lisse, as well as RKVV Saenden.

From there, he became a youth coach for Chinese top flight side Beijing Sinobo Guoan.

Personal life
He is the older brother of Christian Supusepa, also a football player.

References

External links
 

Dutch footballers
Living people
1978 births
Association football midfielders
Eredivisie players
Eerste Divisie players
Derde Divisie players
AFC Ajax players
Dutch people of Moluccan descent
Excelsior Rotterdam players
HFC Haarlem players
FC Dordrecht players
MVV Maastricht players
Footballers from Zaanstad
Quick Boys players
IJsselmeervogels players
FC Lisse players